Daniel Eugene Butler (born December 2, 1954) is an American actor known for his role as Bob "Bulldog" Briscoe on the TV series Frasier (1993–2004); Art in Roseanne (1991–1992); for the voice of Mr. Simmons on the Nickelodeon TV show Hey Arnold (1997–2002), which was later reprised the role in Hey Arnold!: The Jungle Movie (2017); and films roles in Enemy of the State (1998) and Sniper 2 (2001).

Education
Butler was born in Huntington, Indiana, and raised in Fort Wayne, the son of Shirley, a housewife, and Andrew Butler, a pharmacist. While a drama student at Purdue University Fort Wayne in 1975, he received the Irene Ryan Acting Scholarship, sponsored by the Kennedy Center. From 1976 to 1978, he trained at the American Conservatory Theater in San Francisco.

Career
Butler is best known for his role as Bob "Bulldog" Briscoe in the NBC sitcom Frasier, appearing in every season but one between 1993 and 2004. The character was a volatile, boorish, intensely macho sports presenter who hosted the show which followed Frasier's daily broadcast at the radio station KACL.

He is also one of two actors to play two different characters within the Hannibal Lecter franchise. In 1986, he played the role of Jimmy Price, a technician in the film Manhunter; then, 5 years later, he played the role of Roden in 1991's The Silence of The Lambs. The other actor is Frankie Faison.

In 1998, Butler played the role of NSA Director Admiral Shaffer in Enemy of the State.

In 2006, Butler produced and starred in the faux documentary Karl Rove, I Love You (which he also co-wrote and co-directed). Other film work includes roles in Prayers for Bobby and Longtime Companion.

Butler is also an established stage actor. In 2018, he played Lenin in the Broadway revival of Tom Stoppard's Travesties. Other recent appearances include as Truman Capote in American Repertory Theater's 2017 production of Rob Roth's Warhol/Capote and Jack in the 2013 Off-Broadway production of Conor McPherson's The Weir.

Personal life
Butler lives in Vermont and is married to producer Richard Waterhouse. He came out to his family when he was in his early 20s. He wrote a one-man show, The Only Thing Worse You Could Have Told Me, which opened in Los Angeles in 1994 and also played in San Francisco and off-Broadway in New York. It was Butler's public coming out. The play had ten characters "just processing what gay means". He was nominated for the 1995 Drama Desk Award for Outstanding One-Person Show.

Filmography

Film

Television

References

External links
 
 

1954 births
Living people
20th-century American male actors
21st-century American male actors
American male film actors
American male television actors
American gay actors
Indiana University – Purdue University Fort Wayne alumni
LGBT people from Indiana
Male actors from Indiana
Actors from Fort Wayne, Indiana
People from Huntington, Indiana
21st-century American LGBT people